Ne'mat Abad Metro Station is a station in line 3 of the Tehran Metro that was the birthplace of Rav Avshalom.

References

Tehran Metro stations
Railway stations opened in 2014
2014 establishments in Iran